According to the Book of Mormon, King Noah was a wicked monarch best known for burning the prophet Abinadi at the stake. King Noah, described in the Book of Mosiah, is said to have presided over a wicked kingdom guided by false priests.  Noah succeeds his father Zeniff, and is succeeded by his son Limhi.

Lineage

Noah's father Zeniff
Noah's father, Zeniff, led a group of Nephites into the land of their 'first inheritance' (the land originally settled by Lehi and his descendants upon their arrival in the Americas).  Zeniff had made an agreement with the Lamanites in the area, but wars between the two peoples inevitably ensued.  Upon his death Zeniff conferred the kingdom on Noah, who seems to have been far less diligent in preparing and protecting his people against their enemies than his father.  Noah was an extremely wicked man, and he taxed his people heavily, spending the money on extravagances and wickedness.  Possibly the greatest wrong he did his subjects, however, was to teach them to follow his own wicked ways.  He deposed the righteous priests who had been appointed by his father and replaced them with prideful ones.  Through vanity and flattery, they led the people to commit the same sins that they themselves did.  Some of the sins that are listed are pride, laziness, idolatry, whoredoms, adultery, drunkenness, and riotous living.

The prophet Abinadi
The prophet Abinadi was sent to preach repentance to Noah's people but was not immediately successful.  He was imprisoned and taken before King Noah and his priests.  They attempted to "cross him" (or prove him a liar) by asking difficult questions concerning the interpretation of scriptures, including an excerpt from Isaiah, but were unable to do so.  Abinadi began to teach them the Ten Commandments and they attempted to "do away with him" but were unable to touch him because he was protected by the power of God.  He continued to teach them the rest of the Ten Commandments, as well as to interpret further writings of Isaiah and teach them about Jesus Christ.  He finished by testifying that redemption comes through Christ.
Abinadi, having delivered his message, was executed by fire.  As he was dying, he prophesied that Noah and his priests would suffer death in a similar manner.

The priest Alma
One of the priests of Noah, a young man named Alma, believed Abinadi's words and pleaded with the king to spare the prophet's life.  Alma was cast out and was forced to hide so that the servants of the king would not kill him.  He taught the words of Abinadi to more of the people, and many believed him.  He also became a great prophet and religious leader among the rest of the Nephites later in his life.  Hence, Abinadi was successful in his mission although he died a martyr and only one man believed his teachings.
King Noah's wickedness and oppression of his people continued.  Alma and his followers left Noah's people and the king's army were unable to follow them.  A minority of Noah's people became angry with him, including a man named Gideon who swore to kill the king.  They fought, and Noah saw that he was about to lose so he fled to a tower.  From the top of the tower, he saw an army of Lamanites about to attack and convinced Gideon to spare him so that he could lead the people to safety.

Limhi becomes king
Noah and his people fled but were unable to escape the Lamanites.  He ordered them to leave their wives and children behind.  Some did, while others did not.  They were captured by the Lamanites and returned to their lands, where they were taxed one half of all they owned and produced.  They made Noah's son, Limhi, their king.  Those who abandoned their families and stayed with Noah were sorry for their choice.  They turned on Noah and his priests.  They burned Noah to death, but his priests ran away and hid in the wilderness.  The men then returned, determined to find out what had happened to their families and to avenge them or die with them.  They rejoined Limhi's people.

Limhi ruled over his people in captivity for some time.  Eventually they escaped and rejoined the main body of the Nephites in Zarahemla, as did Alma and his followers.  Their story of the wickedness of King Noah and the consequences for his people was most likely a great motivation for the people in accepting King Mosiah's proposition that kingship be done away with among the Nephites.  At the death of Mosiah, kings were replaced with a system of lesser and chief judges.  The first chief judge was Alma (known as Alma the Younger), the son of that Alma who had been a priest of King Noah.

See also

 Zeniff
 Limhi
 Abinadi
 The Record of Zeniff
 Book of Mormon

References

Book of Mormon people